Naxatra News, the news and current affairs channel on Odisha, is the first 24-hour news channel of NK Media Ventures. It was set up in 2009 in Bhubaneswar and is the first 24-hour Oriya current affairs and news channel in Odisha. Promoted by Prabhat Ranjan Mallick, Naxatranews is the group's maiden foray into media.

Company profile
Naxatra News airs local, national and international news, with the focus being more on local news. The channel has tied up with Associated Press Television News (APTN) for its news content. Apart from news, there are various infotainment-based programmes as well as talk shows and panel discussions on current issues.

See also
List of Odia-language television channels

References

External links

24-hour television news channels in India
Odia-language television channels
Television channels and stations established in 2009
Television stations in Bhubaneswar
Companies based in Bhubaneswar
2009 establishments in Orissa